Mama Mirabelle's Home Movies is an animated educational wildlife children's television series. The live action footage comes from the BBC Natural History Unit archives, as well as the National Geographic Society. The series originally aired on CBeebies in the UK and was created by Douglas Wood, who is also the author of the companion children's picture book When Mama Mirabelle Comes Home, published by National Geographic Books. A total of 53 episodes were produced; in the United States, they were packaged as 26 half-hours.

In the American version, all of the animals except Karla and Bo have American voices. Vanessa Williams is the voice of Mama Mirabelle in the US, and Floella Benjamin is the voice for Mama Mirabelle in the UK.

The series is produced by UK animation studio King Rollo Films, whose other shows include Disney's The Adventures of Spot, Discovery Kids' Paz, Noggin's Maisy, Sprout's Poppy Cat and Mr. Benn. The show's opening theme was written by Lester Barnes (the composer for Horrid Henry, Me Too!, Paz and Urmel).

Plot
Set in the African savanna, it focuses on an enthusiastic elephant named Mama Mirabelle, who travels around the world to film real wildlife footage and project them onto a screen of fireflies in front of almost the entire animal kingdom. The "Home Movies" are used for educational purposes not only for the main young characters but for the preschool audience at home.

Characters
Mama Mirabelle the elephant; she always wears a beautiful orange hat with blue flowers on it and is the lead mother of the series. Voiced by Floella Benjamin in the United Kingdom and Vanessa Williams in the United States.
Max the elephant, he is voiced by Phillipa Alexander in the United Kingdom, Teresa Gallagher in the United States, and Josephine Schmidt in Germany, Max is Mama Mirabelle's son. He also loves a bit good muddy fun with his adopted siblings Karla and Bo. 
Karla the zebra, voiced by Teresa Gallagher in both the United Kingdom and the United States, and Jennifer Wieb in Germany, is a bit of a prim and proper animal but loves mud. Her favourite game is called Nuzzle Tag. She is the adopted daughter of Mama Mirabelle. And the adopted sister of Bo and Max.
Bo the cheetah, voiced by Jules de Jongh in both the United States and the United Kingdom, and Jesco Spirtgen in Germany, is the adopted son of Mama Mirabelle and adopted brother of Max and Karla, who loves to pounce.
Merlin the bat – Is voiced by Kuchi Braaso in the United Kingdom and Tajja Isen in the United States.
Kayla the red kangaroo – She is friends with Mama Mirabelle and was voiced by Moya O'Sullivan.
Ronjy the tiger – Seen in Muddy Wonderland.
Kylie, Kayla's daughter. She is voiced by Gabriella Lewis, though she only said one line the each episode she appeared in.
Daddy Stripes the zebra, Karla, Max, and Bo's father. He is voiced by David Holt in the United Kingdom and Lucien Dodge in the United States.
Keisha, Karla's wombat friend. She is voiced by Emma Tate in the United Kingdom and Katie Leigh in the United States.
Benny the bird – Loves to aid. He is voiced by Lizzie Waterworth.
Winnie the cow – Is Karla's friend from the cold area. She is voiced by Sarah Williams.
Jacques the walrus – A fellow traveller of Mama Mirabelle. He is voiced by Alan Marriott.
Mama Bird – Benny's mother, who is voiced by Elly Fairman.
Edna the Echidna – A young echidna who lives in Australia and is voiced by Felicia Hamilton.

Crew
Susan Blu – Voice Director
Kent Meredith – Voice Director

Episodes 
 01. Elephant Walk
 02. The Sounds of the Savanna
 03. A Little Help from My Friends
 04. Baby of a Different Stripe
 05. Hide and Go Seek 
 06. Tell Me About It
 07. To Sleep with Wombats 
 08. All Creatures Great and Small
 09. Anybody Home? 
 10. Healthy Habits
 11. Play's the Thing 
 12. Sam Spades of the Savanna
 13. Gourmet Grazing 
 14. Kings and Queens of the Savanna
 15. I Spy 
 16. Eyes, Ears, Noses, and Trunks
 17. The Boy Can Blow 
 18. I Don't Like Spiders And Snakes
 19. What's in a Tail
 20. Foot Prints in the Sand
 21. Here Today, Gone Tomorrow 
 22. Nobody's Perfect
 23. Things That Go Yip, Howl and Screech in the Night 
 24. Cracking the Code
 25. A Savanna Kwanzaa 
 26. You Must Have Been a Beautiful Baby
 27. Change is Gonna Come
 28. Trumpet While You Work
 29. Spot the Difference 
 30. Hot-and-Cold Running Critters
 31. Why Zebras Can't Fly 
 32. Super Duper Savanna Animals
 33. Come Out of Your Shell 
 34. Travels with Mama
 35. Tails of the Galápagos
 36. Happy Habitats
 37. Savanna Lullaby 
 38. It Gives You Paws
 39. Out of Reach
 40. Family Style
 41. Curtain Up! 
 42. Listen Up!
 43. Rainy Day Blues 
 44. Take Me to the Water
 45. Find Your Way Home 
 46. The Nose Knows
 47. Jumbled Jungle 
 48. Alone Together
 49. Muddy Wonderland 
 50. Do You See What I See?
 51. Have You Heard? 
 52. This is Mama's World
 53. Bat

References

External links
 
Mama Mirabelle's Home Movies at CBeebies
Mama Mirabelle at PBS Kids
Mama Mirabelle's Home Movies at IMDb

PBS original programming
BBC children's television shows
2000s American animated television series
2000s American children's television series
2007 American television series debuts
2008 American television series endings
2000s British animated television series
2000s British children's television series
2007 British television series debuts
2008 British television series endings
American children's animated adventure television series
American flash animated television series
American preschool education television series
American television series with live action and animation
British children's animated adventure television series
British flash animated television series
British preschool education television series
British television series with live action and animation
Animated preschool education television series
2000s preschool education television series
Animated television series about elephants
Nature educational television series
English-language television shows
PBS Kids shows
CBeebies